Wastewater is water generated after the use of freshwater, raw water, drinking water or saline water in a variety of deliberate applications or processes. Another definition of wastewater is "Used water from any combination of domestic, industrial, commercial or agricultural activities, surface runoff / storm water, and any sewer inflow or sewer infiltration". In everyday usage, wastewater is commonly a synonym for sewage (also called sewerage, domestic wastewater, or municipal wastewater), which is wastewater that is produced by a community of people.  

As a generic term wastewater may also be used to describe water containing contaminants accumulated in other settings, such as:
 Industrial wastewater: waterborne waste generated from a variety of industrial processes, such as manufacturing operations, mineral extraction, power generation, or water and wastewater treatment.
 Cooling water, released with potential thermal pollution after use to condense steam or reduce machinery temperatures by conduction or evaporation.
 Leachate: precipitation containing pollutants dissolved while percolating through ores, raw materials, products, or solid waste.
 Return flow: the flow of water carrying suspended soil, pesticide residues, or dissolved minerals and nutrients from irrigated cropland.
 Surface runoff: the flow of water occurring on the ground surface when excess rainwater, stormwater, meltwater, or other sources, can no longer sufficiently rapidly infiltrate in the soil. 
 Urban runoff, including water used for outdoor cleaning activity and landscape irrigation in densely populated areas created by urbanization.
 Agricultural wastewater: animal husbandry wastewater generated from confined animal operations.

References